Belocean was a  heavy lift ship which was built in 1945 for the Ministry of War Transport (MoWT) as Empire Canute. She was completed in 1947 as Belocean for Belships Co Ltd. In 1964 she was sold to Bacong Shipping Co SA, Panama, and renamed Southern Star. In 1968, she was sold to Manila Interocean Lines Inc, Philippines, and renamed Marie Ann, serving until she was scrapped in July 1976.

Description
The ship was built by Greenock Dockyard Co Ltd, Greenock as yard number 462. She was launched on 24 December 1945 and completed in June 1947.

Her GRT was 7,750, a NRT of 4,475, and a DWT of 9,970.

She was propelled steam turbine driving an electric motor and a screw shaft. The turbine was built by the General Electric Company Ltd, Erith. In 1954, Belocean was fitted with a new 8-cylinder 2T EV MAN diesel engine.

History
Empire Canute was built for the MoWT. She is recorded in Lloyd's Register for 1945–46 as being owned by then MoWT and The Clan Line Steamers Ltd, with management being by Cayzer, Irvine & Co Ltd. The Code Letters GKKK were allocated.

In June 1947, she was completed as Belocean for Belships Co Ltd. She was placed under the management of Christen Smith & Co Ltd, Oslo, Norway. The Code Letters LMKX were allocated and her port of registry was Oslo. She was sold in February 1964 to Bacong Shipping Co SA, Panama, and renamed Southern Star. She was operated under the management of Southern Industrial Products Inc. Manila, Philippines. In 1968, she was sold to Manila Interocean Lines Inc, Manila and renamed Marie Ann. She served until 1976, arriving on 29 July at Gadani Beach, Pakistan for scrapping.

References

External links
Photo of Belocean

1945 ships
Ships built on the River Clyde
Ministry of War Transport ships
Empire ships
Merchant ships of the United Kingdom
Steamships of the United Kingdom
Merchant ships of Norway
Steamships of Norway
Merchant ships of Panama
Merchant ships of the Philippines